Zillah High School is a public high school located in Zillah, Washington. It serves 407 students in grades 9–12. 53% of the students are White, while 41% are Hispanic, 3% are American Indian, 1% are Asian, and 1% are Black.

References

External links
Zillah H.S.
Zillah School District #205

Public high schools in Washington (state)
High schools in Yakima County, Washington